Rose Hill may refer to:

People
 Rose Hill (actress) (1914–2003), British actress
 Rose Hill (athlete) (born 1956), British wheelchair athlete

Film
 Rose Hill (film), a 1997 movie

Places

Australia
 Rose Hill, New South Wales

Hungary
 Rose Hill, Budapest

Mauritius
 Beau Bassin-Rose Hill, large commercial town in Mauritius

United Kingdom
 Rose Hill, Derby, inner city suburb in Derby
 Rose Hill, East Sussex, the former name of Brightling Park
 Rose Hill, Lancashire, Burnley
 Rose Hill Marple railway station, Greater Manchester
 Rose Hill, Oxfordshire, city council estate near Oxford
 Rose Hill, Suffolk, Ipswich

United States
 Rose Hill, Illinois
 Rose Hill, Iowa
 Rose Hill, Kansas
 Rose Hill, Jasper County, Mississippi
 Rose Hill, Warren County, Mississippi
 Rose Hill, Manhattan, a neighborhood in New York City
 Rose Hill, New York
 Rose Hill, North Carolina
 Rose Hill, Ohio
 Rose Hill, Garland, Texas, an area annexed by Garland in 1970
 Rose Hill, Harris County, Texas, an unincorporated area
 Rose Hill, San Jacinto County, Texas, an unincorporated community in Texas
 Rose Hill, Albemarle County, Virginia, an unincorporated community
 Rose Hill, Fairfax County, Virginia, a census-designated place
 Rose Hill, Lee County, Virginia, a census-designated place
 Rose Hill, Rappahannock County, Virginia, an unincorporated community

Buildings

United Kingdom
 Rose Hill, Northenden, a 19th-century Victorian villa in Northenden, Manchester, England

United States
 Rose Hill Plantation, a plantation in Tallahassee, Florida
 Rose Hill (Milledgeville, Georgia), a NRHP-listed house in Lockerly Arboretum in Milledgeville, Georgia
 Rose Hill station, a former commuter railroad station on the present-day Union Pacific / North Line in Chicago, Illinois
 Rose Hill (Iowa City, Iowa), listed on the National Register of Historic Places (NRHP) in Johnson County, Iowa
 Rose Hill (Lexington, Kentucky), NRHP-listed in Fayette County
 Rose Hill (Louisville, Kentucky), listed on the NRHP in Kentucky
 Rose Hill (Chestertown, Maryland), in Kent County, listed on the NRHP in Maryland
 Rose Hill (Earleville, Maryland), in Cecil County, from 1837, also NRHP-listed in Maryland
 Rose Hill (Port Tobacco, Maryland), in Charles County, from 1715, also NRHP-listed in Maryland
 Rose Hill (Williamsport, Maryland), in Washington County, from 1802, also NRHP-listed in Maryland
 Rose Hill Manor, in Frederick County, Maryland, from 1795, also NRHP-listed in Maryland
 Rose Hill Mansion, Fayette, New York, listed on the NRHP in New York
 Rose Hill (Guilderland, New York), listed on the NRHP in New York
 Rose Hill, an estate and Tuscan-style villa in Tivoli, New York
 Rose Hill (Grassy Creek, North Carolina), NRHP-listed in Granville County
 Rose Hill (Locust Hill, North Carolina), NRHP-listed in Caswell County
 Rose Hill (Louisburg, North Carolina), NRHP-listed in Franklin County
 Rose Hill (Nashville, North Carolina), NRHP-listed in Nash County
 Rose Hill and Community House, Bay Village, NRHP-listed in Cuyahoga County, Ohio
 Rose Hill (Union, South Carolina), NRHP-listed in Union County, South Carolina
 Rose Hill Plantation House, Bluffton, South Carolina, NRHP-listed in South Carolina
 Rose Hill (Port Arthur, Texas), NRHP-listed in Jefferson County
 Rose Hill (Capron, Virginia), NRHP-listed in Southampton County
 Rose Hill (Front Royal, Virginia), NRHP-listed in Warren County
 Phelps House (Aiken, South Carolina), also called Rose Hill Estate, NRHP-listed in Aiken County

See also
 Rose Hill Cemetery (disambiguation)
 Rose Hill Farm (disambiguation)
 Rose Hill Historic District (disambiguation)
 Rose Hill Methodist Episcopal Church, Rose Hill, Iowa
 Rosehill (disambiguation)
 Fordham University at Rose Hill, Bronx, New York, the largest of Fordham University's three campuses